The Auckland Australian Football League which  began in 1974, is an amateur Australian rules football competition in Auckland, New Zealand currently consisting of 6 clubs and is one of the leagues governed by AFL New Zealand. The league has a men's competition and affiliated women's competition known as Auckland Women's AFL featuring some of the same clubs. The competition runs from September to December to avoid clashes with the rugby football season. 

An earlier league which existed in Auckland from 1904 until the outbreak of World War I was also known, for a time, as the Auckland Australian Football League.

History
The Auckland Australian Football Association (AAFA) was founded by former Australian professional player Terry Gay in 1974, North Shore Tigers were one of the foundation clubs. Four teams were playing in 1988 and it shifted its season to spring. It was renamed Auckland Australian Football League (AAFL) in 1990.

In 2012 the AAFL established a 2nd Division for less competitive clubs however this lated only one year before all clubs were to play in first division.

The league has gone through a period of strong growth in the 2010s with players like Te Kopa Tipene-Tomas, Andriu Sucu and Jackson Clince among the players selected to represent New Zealand on the international stage helping to attract more media exposure for the sport in the city.

Season 2021 was cancelled due to COVID-19 Pandemic restrictions.

Current clubs

Former clubs

Results

Men's

Women's

Historic League
The 'Auckland Football Association (under Victorian rules)' was formed at a meeting at Foresters' Hall, Newton on 28 April 1904. The initial subscription rate was 2s 6d, and forty members were enrolled at that meeting. At the 1906 AGM, the name was changed to 'The Australian Football League of Auckland' in order to differentiate the league from Rugby Union and Association (soccer) football. After several active seasons which were covered in some depth in the local papers, the league went into decline around the end of the decade due to the departure of a number of the Australian players back home. In 1912 the senior competition was put on hold due to the lack of players, with only a junior competition continuing.

Clubs

Players

A number of the players in the league were immigrants from the southern Australian states. Regular mention was made in the newspaper reports of the arrival of these gentlemen and their intentions to play football in Auckland.

Four VFL players played for the league at various times, including Vic Cumberland who was rated one of the best VFL players of the day:

Administrators

The inaugural president of the league in 1904 was a Mr McNamara. He was supported by a large committee that included 5 vice presidents; Messrs Hale, McKeon, Walsh, Kneebone and McVeigh. At the 1905 AGM, Dr Tracy Inglis was elected president, a position he held for a number of years. The league had a number of prominent people involved during it existence. Patrons of the league in 1905 included politicians  George Fowlds and F E Baume.

Competition

The new league's first game was a scratch match held on 30 April on the outer Domain. Several rounds of practice matches followed prior to the start of the competition. By the end of the 1904 season Austral and Imperial were "on a level footing", with Austral taking the honours, 29 to 18, in the final which was held at the Domain Cricket Ground.

References

External links
Official Auckland AFL website
Auckland AFL pages on New Zealand AFL site

External links
Official Site

Australian rules football competitions in New Zealand
Sport in Auckland